Robin Montgomery (born September 5, 2004) is an American tennis player. She has a career-high WTA singles ranking of No. 189, achieved on 27 February 2023 and a doubles ranking of No. 165, achieved on 7 March 2022. She has won two singles and three doubles titles on the ITF Circuit.

A product of the Junior Tennis Champions Center (JTCC), Montgomery made her WTA main draw debut at the 2020 US Open, receiving a wildcard in the women's singles draw. The next year, she returned to juniors, winning the girls' singles and doubles titles at the US Open.

Career

2019: Orange Bowl winner
In August 2019, Montgomery played in the Girls' Singles at the US Open, where she reached the third round, losing to fellow-American Katrina Scott. In September, she represented the US in the final of the Junior Fed Cup, teaming up with Connie Ma to win the doubles match against the Czech Republic and secure victory for the US. In December, she won the "18 and under" title in the 2019 Orange Bowl.

2020: Turned Pro, First ITF title, Junior No. 5, Major and WTA 1000 debuts
Montgomery reached the quarterfinals of the 2020 Australian Open girls' singles tournament in January, and in March she won her first ITF tournament, a $25k event in Las Vegas.  she was at No. 5 in the junior world rankings.

Following the break in the season caused by the COVID-19 pandemic, Montgomery took part in the Western & Southern Open as a wildcard entrant, losing in the first round to tenth seed Sorana Cirstea. The following week, she received a wildcard into the 2020 US Open — her first Grand Slam appearance. She lost in the first round to Yulia Putintseva.

2021: US Open Junior singles and doubles titles
At the 2021 US Open, seventh-seeded Montgomery defeated sixth-seeded Kristina Dmitruk in straight sets in the girls' singles final to win her first Grand Slam singles title. She followed that victory a few hours later with her first Grand Slam doubles title along with her partner Ashlyn Krueger; they defeated fellow American duo Reese Brantmeier and Elvina Kalieva in three sets after coming back from losing the first set to take the second set and win the match tiebreak. Montgomery became the first girl to achieve the feat of winning both titles at the US Open since Michaëlla Krajicek in 2004 and was the first American to take the girls' singles title since Amanda Anisimova in 2017.

2023
She qualified for the 2023 ATX Open in Austin, Texas but lost in the first round to lucky loser Coco Vandeweghe in three tight sets.

Performance timeline

Only main-draw results in WTA Tour, Grand Slam tournaments, Fed Cup/Billie Jean King Cup and Olympic Games are included in win–loss records.

Singles
Current after the 2023 ATX Open.

ITF finals

Singles: 6 (2 titles, 4 runner–ups)

Doubles: 4 (4 titles)

Junior Grand Slam finals

Singles: 1 (title)

Doubles: 1 (title)

Notes

References

External links
 
 

2004 births
Living people
American female tennis players
African-American female tennis players
Tennis players from Washington, D.C.
US Open (tennis) junior champions
Grand Slam (tennis) champions in girls' singles
Grand Slam (tennis) champions in girls' doubles
21st-century African-American sportspeople
21st-century African-American women